Silver Dagger is a fictional character appearing in American comic books published by Marvel Comics.

Publication history

The character first appeared in Doctor Strange #1 (June 1974).

Fictional character biography
Silver Dagger was a former criminal who was also a former Cardinal in the Catholic Church. He was driven mad by reading the Darkhold in the form of the Shiatra Book of the Damned. He became a religious zealot and a sorcerer and began destroying other sorcerers and magical beings, an executioner of the wicked, believing them to be great sinners. He took his name from his weapon, a silver dagger dipped in holy water, a traditional means of destroying demons.

Silver Dagger once infiltrated the Sanctum Sanctorum and threw a silver dagger into Doctor Strange's back, believing him to be a demon-spawn. He also imprisoned and attempted a brainwashing of Clea, but became trapped in the dimension of Agamotto. He stole the Eye of Agamotto while Strange was pulled into the necromantic Orb of Agamotto.

Silver Dagger conquered the dimension within the Orb of Agamotto. Returning to Earth's dimension, he battled Doctor Strange, Spider-Man, Ms. Marvel, and Marie Laveau. He was stabbed by Leveau, and returned to the dimension of Agamotto. Some time later, Silver Dagger surrendered his left eye to Agamotto, who awarded it to Doctor Strange. Silver Dagger then attempted to slay the Werewolf by Night. With his troops, he battled the werewolf motorcycle gang, the Braineaters. He was bitten by the Werewolf and left at the mercy of his own troops, and his eye was inexplicably restored. Silver Dagger then escaped from Agamotto's dimension once again and his own troops were explained. He battled Doctor Strange using his own Eye of Agamotto for the first time, but was taken into custody by Agamotto again. Silver Dagger later battled Doctor Strange, Clea, Rintrah, and Pip the Troll.

Powers and abilities
Silver Dagger was originally an athletic man with a gifted intellect. He possesses an extensive knowledge of Christian theology, particularly of the apocalyptic sect he himself has created; he has earned a D.d. and PhD. in theology from a Jesuit college. He has some knowledge of magic and sorcery, which he formerly employed for a variety of effects; he has since repudiated all use of cast magic as "Satanic". He has the ability to hurl bladed weapons with a high degree of accuracy, and has familiarity with a variety of automatic weapons. He has basic hand-to-hand combat skills, including some aikido, judo, and boxing. He has a high degree of skill for strategy and tactics used in commando-style low intensity conflict, and guerilla warfare techniques. Also, he is an exceptionally charismatic personality, possessing powers of persuasion which border on superhuman, especially when addressing large groups of people.

Silver Dagger's left eye was later replaced by the original Eye of Agamotto, and can project silver beams of mystical force. He wears a leather bodysuit, and the rear of his belt has a number of holders for throwing daggers. He carried specially-crafted 9" silver throwing daggers which have been dipped in holy water for enhanced effectiveness against supernatural creatures. Silver Dagger and his team of zealot commandos have been known to make use of a variety of automatic weapons which have been modified to fire silver bullets, as well as sophisticated communications devices and other items used for stealth combat.

References

External links
http://www.marvel.com/universe/Silver_Dagger

Characters created by Steve Englehart
Fictional blade and dart throwers
Fictional characters missing an eye
Fictional knife-fighters
Marvel Comics characters who use magic
Marvel Comics supervillains